Azimut may refer to:

Azimut Holding, an Italian asset management company
Azimut Hotels, a Russian hotel management company
Azimut Yachts, an Italian yacht-manufacturing company
Azimut (Alice album), 1982
Azimut (Perigeo album), 1972

See also
Azimuth